Don Kindt Jr. is a former tight end in the National Football League. He played with the Chicago Bears during the 1987 NFL season.

He is the son of former NFL Pro Bowler Don Kindt.

References

Players of American football from Milwaukee
Chicago Bears players
American football tight ends
Wisconsin–La Crosse Eagles football players
1961 births
Living people
National Football League replacement players